The Camitz family is a Swedish family, founded as an Austrian Silesian noble family, important to the industrial history of the broader Karlskoga–Degerfors-area. Where they managed ironworks.

A member of the Camitz family, ironmaster Georg Camitz, established the Degerfors Works in the 17th century, and managed both the Bofors and the Björkborn Works. In addition, he served as the mayor of Kristinehamn. Other members include Johan Camitz the Younger, who in the 18th century served as the first ironmaster to the Degernäs Works.

Connected families include the Strokirk family whose members married into the Camitz family.

See also 

 Johan Camitz
 Ulf Camitz

References 

Swedish families
Austrian families